Lake Sherwood is an unincorporated community in the Santa Monica Mountains, in Ventura County, California overlooking Lake Sherwood reservoir. It is a body contact lake, swimming, fishing, SUP and boating allowed, located south of the Conejo Valley and city of Thousand Oaks, and west of Westlake Village. The lake is naturally fed by thousand of acres of open-space, watershed mountains and natural springs.

While homes have been around the lake since the reservoir was created by the construction of Sherwood Dam in 1901, the community expanded with the development of the Sherwood Country Club golf course surrounded by luxury homes.

The ZIP Code is 91361, and the community is inside area code 805. The population was 1,759 at the 2020 census. For statistical purposes, the United States Census Bureau has defined Lake Sherwood as a census-designated place (CDP). The census definition of the area may not precisely correspond to local understanding of the area with the same name.

Geography

According to the United States Census Bureau, the CDP covers an area of 3.3 square miles (8.6 km2), 3.1 square miles (8.1 km2) of it is land and 0.2 square miles (0.5 km2) of it (5.65%) is water.

Physical character
Lake Sherwood has approximately 660 residences and consists of a guard-gated golf-club community, three electronic-gated communities, and lake-view homes along Lake Sherwood Drive. The area is almost completely residential, most residents using neighboring Thousand Oaks, Westlake Village, or Agoura Hills for commercial needs.

Demographics

The 2010 United States Census reported that Lake Sherwood had a population of 1,527. The racial makeup of Lake Sherwood was 1,368 (89.6%) White, 5 (0.3%) African American, 1 (0.1%) Native American, 101 (6.6%) Asian, 0 (0.0%) Pacific Islander, 9 (0.6%) from other races, and 43 (2.8%) from two or more races. Hispanic or Latino of any race were 52 persons (3.4%).

The Census reported that all residents lived in single-family households. There were 558 households, out of which 194 (34.8%) had children under the age of 18 living in them, 429 (76.9%) were opposite-sex married couples living together, 25 (4.5%) had a female householder with no husband present, 18 (3.2%) had a male householder with no wife present. There were 12 (2.2%) unmarried opposite-sex partnerships, and 4 (0.7%) same-sex married couples or partnerships. 72 households (12.9%) were made up of individuals, and 32 (5.7%) had someone living alone who was 65 years of age or older. The average household size was 2.74. There were 472 families (84.6% of all households); the average family size was 2.96.

The population is spread out, with 368 people (24.1%) under the age of 18, 92 people (6.0%) aged 18 to 24, 198 people (13.0%) aged 25 to 44, 623 people (40.8%) aged 45 to 64, and 246 people (16.1%) who were 65 years of age or older. The median age was 49.0 years. For every 100 females, there were 96.3 males. For every 100 females age 18 and over, there were 95.1 males.

The homeowner vacancy rate was 2.4%; the rental vacancy rate was 7.3%.  1,418 people (92.9% of the population) lived in owner-occupied housing units and 109 people (7.1%) lived in rental housing units.

Education
The area is served by the Conejo Valley Unified School District. Students attend Westlake Elementary, Colina Middle School, and Westlake High School.

Notable people
Among the notable residents are hockey great Wayne Gretzky, who lived in a Georgian-style estate designed by fellow Canadian, Richard Landry. Gretzky sold the estate in 2007 for 18.5 million to another sports-star, baseball's Lenny Dykstra and moved to a slightly less extravagant mansion in the community. Since then, Dykstra's financial and legal problems forced him to sell the estate to a private individual and move away from the community. Dykstra declared bankruptcy, causing him to lose the property to foreclosure and in 2018 Gretzky repurchased the same property that he previously sold to Dykstra. Singer Paul Anka moved to Lake Sherwood in 2007 and owns multiple properties in the exclusive neighborhood. Tom Petty lived in a lakefront retreat that was originally built in 1931. Producer/Author/Journalist Larry Garrison resides with his wife. The tennis legend Pete Sampras and his wife, actress Bridgette Wilson, built a very large, modern, hilltop estate they have since moved from the house. Britney Spears moved to the community in 2011 but recently moved into nearby Hidden Valley. Many other famous inhabitants own property in the community, however, they are only part-time residents and use their estates as a second home or as a retreat. Sylvester Stallone owned a lakefront hideaway that was featured in the film American Pie. Also, William Randolph Hearst, who was one of the first famous residents in the area and owned property around the lake, used his estate as a vacation getaway during the 1920s and 1930s.

Motion picture and television location

Lake Sherwood lies just west of several major movie ranches and has frequently been used as a filming location for television shows like The Dukes of Hazzard, The Rockford Files, and Little House on the Prairie.

Lake Sherwood was named from being the location for Sherwood Forest in the 1922 film, Robin Hood, starring Douglas Fairbanks.  The 1938 film, The Adventures of Robin Hood, starring Errol Flynn, also had a single scene shot on location at "Sherwood Forest".

A mock cliff was constructed for several film serials, the lake was often used for motorboat chases and bordering forests were used for Tarzan and Jungle Jim films, and The Tiger Woman. A full scale Tibetan village was built for Lost Horizon, an Italian village for Blake Edwards's What Did You Do in the War, Daddy? (1966) and an alien village for Jonathan Frakes's Star Trek: Insurrection (1998).

The film Bridesmaids (2011) was filmed in the community. The Sherwood Country Club was prominently featured in the pre-wedding scenes.

Filmography
Films shot in Lake Sherwood include:

 Robin Hood (1922)
 The Long, Long Trail (1929)
 The Apache Kid's Escape (1930)
 The Fighting Legion (1930)
 The Great Meadow (1931)
 The Nevada Buckaroo (1931)
 The Squaw Man (1931)
 Tarzan the Ape Man (1932)
 The Boiling Point (1932)
 Destry Rides Again (1932)
 The Gay Buckaroo (1932)
 Honor of the Mounted (1932)
 The Last of the Mohicans (1932)
 The Man from Hell's Edges (1932)
 Crossfire (1933)
 Deadwood Pass (1933)
 Tarzan the Fearless (1933)
 Galloping Romeo (1933)
 The Red Rider (1934)
 Tarzan and His Mate (1934)
 Thunder Mountain (1935)
 The Cowboy and the Kid (1936)
 The Last of the Mohicans (1936)
 Lost Horizon (1937)
 The Devil's Saddle Legion (1937)
 Way Out West (1937)
 The Adventures of Robin Hood (1938)
 Billy the Kid Returns (1938)
 The Last Stand (1938)
 The Painted Trail (1938)
 Allegheny Uprising (1939)
 Tarzan Finds a Son! (1939)
 Desperate Trails (1939)
 Adventures of Red Ryder (1940)
 Dark Command (1940)
 Hidden Gold (1940)
 The Man from Dakota (1940)
 The Ranger and the Lady (1940)
 Virginia City (1940)
 Belle Starr (1941)
 Jungle Girl (1941)
 King of the Texas Rangers (1941)
 Romance on the Range (1942)
 The Jungle Book (1942)
 Silver Spurs (1943)
 Wagon Tracks West (1943)
 Tarzan Triumphs (1943)
 The Tiger Woman (1944)
 The Cisco Kid Returns (1945)
 Red River Renegades (1946)
 The Man from Texas (1947)
 On the Spanish Trail (1947)
 Redwood Forest Trail (1950)
 Three Hours to Kill (1954)
 Old Yeller (1958)
 What Did You Do in the War, Daddy? (1966)
 Butch Cassidy and the Sundance Kid (1969)
 Tell Them Willie Boy Is Here (1970)
 Another Man, Another Woman (1977)
 Doctor Dolittle (1998)
 Star Trek: Insurrection (1998)
 Bridesmaids (2011)

See also
 Sherwood Dam
 Santa Monica Mountains National Recreation Area

References

Unincorporated communities in California
Census-designated places in Ventura County, California
Populated places in the Santa Monica Mountains